Ryegrass mosaic virus (RMV) is a virus in the genus Rymovirus. As the name suggests its hosts include ryegrass, but also other relatives in the family Poaceae. RMV's genome was sequenced in 2015.

References

Potyviridae
Viral plant pathogens and diseases
Monocot diseases